Walker or The Walker may refer to:

People
Walker (given name)
Walker (surname)
Walker (Brazilian footballer) (born 1982), Brazilian footballer

Places

In the United States
Walker, Arizona, in Yavapai County
Walker, Mono County, California
Walker, Illinois
Walker, Iowa
Walker, Kansas
Walker, Louisiana
Walker, Michigan
Walker, Minnesota
Walker, Missouri
Walker, West Virginia
Walker, Wisconsin
Walker Brook, a stream in Minnesota
Walker Charcoal Kiln, Arizona
Walker Lake (disambiguation), several lakes
Walker Pass, California
Walker River, Nevada
Walker Township (disambiguation), several places

Other places
Walker, Edmonton, Alberta, Canada
Walker, Newcastle upon Tyne, England
Walker Island (Northern Tasmania), Tasmania, Australia
Walker Island (Southern Tasmania), Tasmania, Australia
Walker Mountains, in Antarctica
 Walker (crater), a lunar impact crater on the far side of the Moon

In arts, entertainment, and media

Fictional entities
Walker (Star Wars), a vehicle from the Star Wars films
Walker Brodsky, a recurring character and young artist from Disney Channel series Andi Mack
Mr. Walker (for "Ghost who walks"), name used by The Phantom when in Western society
Walker, enforcer of the status quo and character in Simon R. Green's Nightside (book series)
Walker, the name for the type of zombies in The Walking Dead (TV series)
Bethany Walker, in the film, Jumanji: Welcome to the Jungle
Katie Walker, in the TV series Power Rangers Time Force

Films
Walker (film), a 1987 film about William Walker
The Walker, a 2007 film written and directed by Paul Schrader

Music
Walker (album), the soundtrack album from the Alex Cox film, written and produced by Joe Strummer
"The Walker" (song), a song by Fitz and The Tantrums
"The Walker" or "La Marcheuse", a song by Christine and the Queens from the album Chris

Television
Walker, Texas Ranger, a 1993–2001 American action-drama television series that aired on CBS
Walker (TV series), a reboot television series, based on the original 1993–2001 series, that airs on The CW

Other arts, entertainment, and media
Walker (video game), an Amiga 500 game

Brands, organizations, and enterprises
Walker, a brand of automotive exhaust parts from Tenneco corporation
Amiga Walker, a prototype of an Amiga computer
Colt Walker, a single action revolver designed by Samuel Colt in 1846
J. W. Walker & Sons Ltd, English organ builders
Walker Art Center, in Minneapolis, Minnesota, United States
Walker Art Gallery, in Liverpool, England
Walker Books, a British publisher of children's books, most famous for the Where's Wally?/Where's Waldo? series
Walker Business College, defunct African American vocational and business school in two locations in the U.S.
Walker Corporation, Australian-based property development company
Walker Motor Car Company, active from 1905 to 1906 in Detroit, Michigan, United States
Walker & Co., an American publisher

Education
Walker School, historic elementary school building in Taunton, Massachusetts, United States
Walker School of Business, Piedmont University, Georgia, United States
Walker Riverside Academy, secondary school in Newcastle upon Tyne, Tyne and Wear, England
The Walker School, private school in Marietta, Georgia, United States

Other uses
Walker (escort), a man who accompanies fashionable women to society events
Walker (machine), a vehicle that moves on legs rather than wheels or tracks
Walker (mobility), a two or four-footed frame that elderly or disabled people use as a walking aid
Baby walker, used by infants who cannot walk on their own
Walker, a person traveling by walking; see pedestrian
Walker, someone who is sleepwalking
Walker, another name for a fuller
, a British destroyer in commission in the Royal Navy from 1918 to 1932 and from 1939 to 1945
Walker tariff, an 1846 U.S. tariff
Walker circulation, a conceptual model of the air flow in the tropics in the lower atmosphere (troposphere).

See also
Walker Brothers (disambiguation)
Walkers (disambiguation)
Walking (disambiguation)
Justice Walker (disambiguation)